Trudovoi Tiraspol is the main newspaper of the largest city of Transnistria, the breakaway region of Moldova. It is Russian for Working Tiraspol. It appears in its capital Tiraspol. It is normally not available in the rest of Transnistria, with the exception of Bender, the region's second largest city.

Mass media in Transnistria
Russian-language newspapers published in Moldova
Mass media in Tiraspol